Baron Ravensdale, of Ravensdale in the County of Derby, is a title in the Peerage of the United Kingdom.

History

The title was created on 2 November 1911 for the Conservative politician George Curzon, 1st Baron Curzon, with remainder, in default of issue male, to his eldest daughter and the heirs male of her body, failing whom to his other daughters in like manner in order of primogeniture. Curzon was created Viscount Scarsdale and Earl Curzon of Kedleston at the same time. The viscounty was created with special remainder to the heirs male of his father while the earldom was created with normal remainder to heirs male. Curzon had already in 1898 been created Baron Curzon of Kedleston in the Peerage of Ireland (the last Irish peerage to be created), with remainder to heirs male. In 1916 he succeeded his father as fifth Baron Scarsdale and in 1921 he was further honoured when he was made Earl of Kedleston and Marquess Curzon of Kedleston, with remainder to heirs male.

Lord Curzon died without male issue in 1925 and the barony of Curzon of Kedleston, the two earldoms and the marquessate thus became extinct. He was succeeded in the viscountcy of Scarsdale according to the special remainder by his nephew, Richard Curzon, the second Viscount (who also succeeded as sixth Baron Scarsdale; see Viscount Scarsdale for further history of this branch of the family). The barony of Ravensdale passed according to the special remainder to his eldest daughter Irene. In 1958, following the passage of the Life Peerages Act 1958 which permitted women to sit in the House of Lords, Lady Ravensdale was granted a life peerage with the title of Baroness Ravensdale of Kedleston, of Kedleston in the County of Derby.  the title is held by her great-great-nephew the fourth Baron, who succeeded in 2017 and was elected to sit in the House of Lords in 2019. He is the great-grandson of Lady Cynthia (second daughter of Lord Curzon of Kedleston) and her husband Sir Oswald Mosley, 6th Baronet. He also succeeded his grandfather as eighth Baronet of Ancoats (see Mosley Baronets for earlier history of this title).

Barons Ravensdale (1911)
George Nathaniel Curzon, 1st Marquess Curzon of Kedleston, 1st Baron Ravensdale (1859–1925)
Mary Irene Curzon, 2nd Baroness Ravensdale (1896–1966)
Nicholas Mosley, 3rd Baron Ravensdale (1923–2017)
Daniel Nicholas Mosley, 4th Baron Ravensdale (b. 1982)

The heir apparent is the present holder's eldest son, Hon. Alexander Lucas Mosley (b. 2012)

Line of succession

  George Curzon, 1st Marquess Curzon of Kedleston, 1st Baron Ravensdale (1859–1925)
   Mary Irene Curzon, 2nd Baroness Ravensdale, Baroness Ravensdale of Kedleston (1896–1966)
 Lady Cynthia Mosley (1898–1933)
  Nicholas Mosley, 3rd Baron Ravensdale (1923–2017)
 The Hon. Shaun Nicholas Mosley (1949–2009)  Daniel Mosley, 4th Baron Ravensdale (born 1982) Elected to replace John, 2nd Viscount Slim, in 2019. (1) The Hon. Alexander Lucas Mosley (b. 2012)
 (2) The Hon. William Mosley (b. 2015)
 (3)  The Hon. Oliver Mosley (b.2015 - twin)
 (4) The Hon. Matthew Mosley (b. 1985)
 (5) The Hon. Francis Mosley (b. 1988)
 (6) The Hon. Aidan Mosley (b. 1991)
 (7) The Hon. Thomas Mosley (b. 1993)
 (8) The Hon. Ivo Mosley (b. 1951)
 (9) Nathaniel Mosley (b. 1982)
 (10) Felix Mosley (b. 1985)
 (11) Reuben Mosley (b. 2010)
 (12) Scipio Mosley (b. 1988)
 (13) Noah Mosley (b. 1990)
 (14)  The Hon. Robert Mosley (b. 1955)
 (15) Gregory Mosley (b. 1981)
 (16) Vija Mosley (b. 1985)
 (17) Orson Mosley (b. 1994)
 (18) The Hon. Marius Mosely (b. 1976)
 (19) Xavier Mosley (b. 2011) 
 Lady Alexandra Metcalfe (1904–1995)
 David Metcalfe (1927–2012)
 (20) Julian Metcalfe (b. 1959)
 (21) Michael Metcalfe (b. 1993)
 (22) Billy Metcalfe (b. 1995)
 (23) Charles Metcalfe (b. 1962)
 (24) Louis Metcalfe (b. 1993)
 (25) Percy Metcalfe (b. 1996)
 (26) Edward Metcalfe (b. 1970)

The descendants of Lady Alexandra Metcalfe are in remainder only to the Barony of Ravensdale.  The Mosley Baronetcy would follow the Mosley line of succession with the next person in line after Xavier Mosley being George Christopher Mosley (b. 1959), grandson of the youngest son of the 5th Baronet and who has male issue.

See also
Viscount Scarsdale
Baron Anslow
Mosley Baronets

References

Kidd, Charles, Williamson, David (editors). Debrett's Peerage and Baronetage (1990 edition). New York: St Martin's Press, 1990.

 
Baronies in the Peerage of the United Kingdom

1911 establishments in the United Kingdom
Noble titles created in 1911
Noble titles created for UK MPs
Peerages created with special remainders